Albert Gregory Meyer (March 9, 1903 – April 9, 1965) was an American prelate of the Roman Catholic Church. He served as archbishop of the Archdiocese of Chicago in Illinois from 1958 until his death in 1965, and was appointed a cardinal in 1959.  He previously served as archbishop of the Archdiocese of Milwaukee in Wisconsin from 1953 to 1958 and as bishop of the Diocese of Superior in Wisconsin from 1946 to 1953.

Meyer was a strong advocate for racial justice and a firm supporter of Dr. Martin Luther King Jr. He was also a voice for religious tolerance and for the reconciliation of the Catholic Church with the Jewish people.

Biography

Early life and education 
Albert Meyer was born in Milwaukee, Wisconsin, to Peter James Meyer, a grocer, and Mathilda (née Thelen) Meyer, both German immigrants. The fourth of five children, he had two brothers and two sisters; one sister became a nun. As a child, Albert Meyer would pretend to celebrate mass with a toy altar and a glass of water for the chalice of wine.

Meyer received his early education under the School Sisters of Notre Dame at the parochial school of St. Mary's Parish in Milwaukee. After attending Marquette Academy in Milwaukee for two years, he entered St. Francis Seminary in St. Francis, Wisconsin at age 14. In 1922, he was sent by Archbishop Sebastian Messmer to Rome to continue his studies at the Pontifical North American College.

Priesthood 
On July 11, 1926, Meyer was ordained to the priesthood by Cardinal Basilio Pompili, at the church of Santa Maria sopra Minerva in Rome. He then studied at the Pontifical Biblical Institute, obtaining a Doctorate in Holy Scriptures in 1930.

After returning to Wisconsin in 1930, Meyer was appointed as curate at St. Joseph's Parish in Waukesha, Wisconsin. In 1931, he became a professor at St. Francis Seminary, teaching religion, Greek, Latin, biblical archeology, dogmatic theology and scriptures. When Monsignor Aloisius Muench was named bishop of the Diocese of Fargo, Meyer succeeded him as rector of St. Francis Seminary in 1937. He was raised to the rank of domestic prelate, with the title of monsignor, in 1938, and also served as a chaplain and adviser to the local Serra Club.

Bishop of Superior 
On February 18, 1946, Meyer was appointed the sixth bishop of the Diocese of Superior by Pope Pius XII. Meyer was consecrated on April 11, 1946, by Archbishop Moses E. Kiley, with Bishops Muench and William O'Connor serving as co-consecrators, in the Cathedral of St. John the Evangelist in Milwaukee.

Archbishop of Milwaukee 
Pius XII appointed Meyer as the seventh archbishop of the Archdiocese of Milwaukee on July 21, 1953.  He was installed on September 24, 1953.

Archbishop of Chicago 
Pius Xll appointed Meyer as archbishop of the Archdiocese of Chicago on September 19, 1958.  He was installed on November 14, 1958.

On December 1, 1958, a fire broke out at Our Lady of the Angels School in Chicago, killing 92 students and three nuns.  While visiting the hospital and morgue with Chicago Mayor Richard Daley, Meyer was overcome with grief.  Cardinal Francis Spellman came to Chicago from New York City to support Meyer and Pope John XXIII sent a telegram of condolence to Meyer. After the fire, the archdiocese faced $44 million in lawsuits from the families of victims and survivors.  After six years of settlement talks, Meyer decided to provide reparations to all the victims and survivors.

Archbishop Meyer is featured in the 1958 film Decision for Happiness, produced by the Congregation of Sisters of St. Agnes.

In 1960, Meyer banned bingo games from parishes in the archdiocese in response to reports of corruption in the management of the games. In January 1961, during riots in the African-American Bronzeville neighborhood of Chicago, Meyer made this public statement:We must remove from the church on the local scene any possible taint of racial discrimination or racial segregation, and help provide the moral leadership for eliminating racial discrimination from the whole community.

Cardinal
Despite skepticism, Meyer was created Cardinal Priest of S. Cecilia by Pope John XXIII in the consistory of December 14, 1959. Church observers were surprised by his appointment as he had not spent much time in Rome after finishing his education. He participated at the first three sessions of the Second Vatican Council, from 1962 to 1964, and sat on its Board of Presidency. During the council, Meyer showed himself to be of liberal tendencies and was viewed as the chief intellectual among the participating American hierarchy. The scholarly and often shy prelate supported religious liberty, and strongly condemned racism, giving speeches alongside Martin Luther King Jr. and warning his clergy "not to foster the flame of racial hatred". Meyer was also one of the cardinal electors in the 1963 papal conclave, which selected Pope Paul VI. Meyer, an occasional fisherman, once called fishing the "apostolic recreation", and was also known to attend a Milwaukee Braves baseball game.

Death
Albert Meyer died at age 62 on April 9, 1965 at Mercy Hospital in Chicago three days after surgery to remove a malignant brain tumor. The American Jewish Committee called Meyer"...one of the great liberal spirits of our time."

He is buried in the cemetery of the University of Saint Mary of the Lake in Mundelein, Illinois.

See also
 Catholic Church hierarchy
 Catholic Church in the United States
 Historical list of the Catholic bishops of the United States
 List of Catholic bishops of the United States
 Lists of patriarchs, archbishops, and bishops

References

External links
Cardinal Albert Meyer, The Cardinals of the Holy Roman Church
Official site of the Holy See

1903 births
1965 deaths
20th-century American cardinals
Roman Catholic archbishops of Chicago
American people of German descent
Participants in the Second Vatican Council
People from Chicago
Roman Catholic bishops of Superior
Roman Catholic archbishops of Milwaukee
Cardinals created by Pope John XXIII
Pontifical Biblical Institute alumni
Marquette University High School alumni